Ethnography is a peer-reviewed academic journal covering the field of ethnography. The editors-in-chief are Sarah Bracke (University of Amsterdam) and Francio Guadeloupe (University of Amsterdam). It was established in 2000 and is published by SAGE Publications.

Abstracting and indexing 
The journal is abstracted and indexed in Scopus and the Social Sciences Citation Index. According to the Journal Citation Reports, its 2014 impact factor is 1.041.

References

External links 
 

SAGE Publishing academic journals
English-language journals
Ethnography journals
Quarterly journals
Publications established in 2000